Jintan District is a district under the administration of Changzhou in the Jiangsu province of the People's Republic of China.

History 
Jintan, known as Jinshan in ancient times, was a township of Yanling commandery since the reign of the Emperor Yuan of Jin. Then it was promoted by its inhabitants as Jinshan county to strengthen the local vigilance in the late Sui dynasty, without permission. As a densely populated area, the county was reestablished in about 688 under the Tang dynasty, but since there was a namesake in present-day Jinhua, Zhejiang, it was named after Jintan, a hill of Mao Mountain.

Location
On November 10, 1993, Jintan was reclassified from a county and officially became a city. In 1987, the County comprised 22 towns, with the county government located in Jincheng town. The county was part of Changzhou, Jiangsu province. , it has a permanent resident population of 552,047. Jintan is a 2-3 hour bus ride from Shanghai.

Administrative divisions
In the present, Jintan District has 7 towns.
7 towns

Dialect
Wu Chinese is the local dialect of Jintan. Some versions include the local dialect and the northern Jiangsu dialect. A fusion of languages has been created due to the geographical location of Jintan. The language habits of migrants have influenced the local language.

Environment

Geography and geomorphology

Lakes and Rivers
This lake is one of the ten largest freshwater lakes in Jiangsu province.

Climate
Jintan District comes under the Northern Subtropical Monsoon climate zone. Jintan City's climate is mild and humid with four distinct seasons. The frost-free period covers 228 days and the average humidity is 78%.

Economy

Notable people
 Duan Yucai (1735–1815), philologist
Hua Luogeng (1910-1985), mathematician and politician
 Xifeng Wu, epidemiologist

References

External links

 
Cities in Jiangsu
Changzhou